Frederick William (17 October 1819 – 30 May 1904) was a German sovereign who ruled over the state of Mecklenburg-Strelitz as Grand Duke from 1860 until his death.

Biography
He was born in Neustrelitz, the son of Grand Duke Georg of Mecklenburg-Strelitz and Princess Marie of Hesse-Kassel. He spent his youth in Neustrelitz and later went to study history and jurisprudence in University of Bonn where he befriended Prince Albert of Saxe-Coburg and Gotha. After finishing his studies, he went travelling to Italy and Switzerland. He became a Doctor of Civil Law of the University of Oxford.

Friedrich Wilhelm succeeded as Grand Duke on the death of his father on 6 September 1860. During his reign, Mecklenburg-Strelitz became a member first of the North German Confederation and then the German Empire. Friedrich Wilhelm was a large land owner with more than half of the entire grand duchy, his personal property.

He died at Neustrelitz on 30 May 1904 and was succeeded by his only son, who became Adolf Friedrich V.

Marriage and children
Friedrich Wilhelm was married on 28 June 1843 at Buckingham Palace to his first cousin, Princess Augusta of Cambridge, a member of the British Royal Family and a granddaughter of King George III. The two were also second cousins on their fathers' side. They had two sons:

Duke Frederick William of Mecklenburg-Strelitz (born and died in London, 13 January 1845).
Duke Adolphus Frederick of Mecklenburg-Strelitz (1848–1914); succeeded his father as Adolphus Frederick V, Grand Duke of Mecklenburg-Strelitz.

Friedrich Wilhelm and his wife Augusta celebrated their diamond wedding anniversary by distributing 25 Pfennig from the public treasury to every citizen of the grand duchy.

Titles, styles and honours

Titles and styles
17 October 1819 – 6 September 1860: His Royal Highness The Hereditary Grand Duke of Mecklenburg-Strelitz
6 September 1860 – 30 May 1904: His Royal Highness The Grand Duke of Mecklenburg-Strelitz

Honours
German honours

Foreign honours

Ancestry

References

1819 births
1904 deaths
Protestant monarchs
Dukes of Mecklenburg-Strelitz
House of Mecklenburg-Strelitz
People from Neustrelitz
Hereditary Grand Dukes of Mecklenburg-Strelitz
Grand Dukes of Mecklenburg-Strelitz
Grand Crosses of the Order of Saint Stephen of Hungary
Recipients of the Order of the Netherlands Lion
Recipients of the Order of the White Eagle (Russia)
Recipients of the Order of St. Anna, 1st class
Recipients of the Order of Saint Stanislaus (Russian), 1st class
Grand Crosses of the Order of the Star of Romania
Extra Knights Companion of the Garter
Honorary Knights Grand Cross of the Order of the Bath